Patilwa is a small village in Mohania block of Kaimur district, Bihar, India. As of 2011, its population was 541, in 68 households.

References 

Villages in Kaimur district